The Granites Airport  is located at The Granites, a large gold mine in the Tanami Desert in  the Northern Territory of Australia. A $5.1 million upgrade to the airport was completed in 2012, sealing the runway and allowing all-weather jet operations catering to approximately 950 Fly-in fly-out workers employed at the remote site. Additionally, the Royal Flying Doctor Service also use the airport for aeromedical flights supporting the surrounding region.

Airlines and destinations

See also
 List of airports in the Northern Territory

References

Airports in the Northern Territory